Princess Anna Monika Pia of Saxony, Duchess of Saxony (4 May 1903 – 8 February 1976) was the seventh and youngest child of Frederick Augustus III of Saxony and his wife Archduchess Luise of Austria, Princess of Tuscany and a younger sister of both Georg, Crown Prince of Saxony, and Friedrich Christian, Margrave of Meissen.

Early life
While pregnant with Anna, her mother Luise left Saxony on 9 December 1902 without her children. Anna was born in Lindau, Bavaria, during her parents' separation; after her mother's second marriage in 1907, Luise sent the child to the royal court in Dresden where she was raised with her five siblings by her father Frederick Augustus.

Marriage and issue
Anna married Archduke Joseph Francis of Austria, eldest son of Archduke Joseph August of Austria and his wife Princess Auguste Maria of Bavaria, on 4 October 1924 at Schloss Sibyllenort in Sibyllenort, Silesia, Germany. Anna and Joseph Francis had eight children:

Archduchess Margarethe of Austria (17 August 1925 – 3 May 1979) married Alexander Czech, Prince of Monteleone, son of General Jószef Cech (1855-1938) and Princess Amalia Erba Odescalchi dei Principi di Monteleone (1889-1969). Based on his ancestry Alexander was awarded with the title of Principe di Monteleone by King Victor Emmanuel III of Italy, just before his marriage to the Archduchess.
Archduchess Ilona of Austria (20 April 1927 – 12 January 2011) married Georg Alexander, Duke of Mecklenburg
Archduchess Anna-Theresia Gabriella of Austria (19 April 1928 – 28 November 1984)
Archduke Joseph Árpád of Austria (8 February 1932 – 30 April 2017) married Princess Maria von Löwenstein-Wertheim-Rosenberg
Archduke István Dominik Anton Umberto of Austria (1 July 1934 – 24 October 2011) married Maria Anderl
Archduchess Maria Kynga Beatrix of Austria (born 27 August 1938) married, firstly, Ernst Kiss. She married, secondly, Joachim Krist on 30 March 1988.
Archduke Géza Ladislaus of Austria (born 14 November 1940) married Monika Decker
Archduke Michael Koloman of Austria (born 5 May 1942) married Princess Christiana of Löwenstein-Wertheim-Rosenberg  (born 1940, daughter of Charles, Prince of Löwenstein-Wertheim-Rosenberg)

Fifteen years after the death of Joseph Francis in Carcavelos, Portugal, on 25 September 1957, Anna married Reginald Kazanjian (1905–1990) in a civil ceremony on 28 July 1971 in Geneva, Switzerland, and in a religious ceremony on 9 September 1971 in Veyrier, Switzerland. On 8 February 1976, she died in Munich, Germany, aged 72.

Ancestry

References

1903 births
1976 deaths
House of Wettin
Saxon princesses
People from Lindau
Austrian princesses
German Roman Catholics
Burials at Palatinal Crypt
Daughters of kings